The Belarus Census of 2019 is the third census in Belarus after it became an independent state after the dissolution of the Soviet Union. The census was carried out during October 4–30, 2019. It is the first census in the country that incorporated a website where residents could fill out an online form to participate.

See also
Belarus Census (1999)
Belarus Census (2009)

References

Demographics of Belarus
Census
2019 censuses
Censuses in Belarus